Tephritis monapunctata is a species of tephritid or fruit flies in the genus Tephritis of the family Tephritidae.

Distribution
The species is known to exist in northeastern China.

References

Tephritinae
Insects described in 1990
Diptera of Asia